Nathalie Bates (born 29 March 1980) is a road cyclist from Australia. She represented her nation at the 1998, 2004, 2005, 2006 and 2008 UCI Road World Championships. At the 2006 Commonwealth Games she won the gold medal in the women's road race.

References

External links
 profile at Procyclingstats.com

1980 births
Australian female cyclists
Living people
Place of birth missing (living people)
Commonwealth Games gold medallists for Australia
Cyclists at the 2006 Commonwealth Games
Commonwealth Games medallists in cycling
People educated at James Ruse Agricultural High School
Medallists at the 2006 Commonwealth Games